Archibald Pitcairne or Pitcairn (25 December 165220 October 1713) was a Scottish physician.
He was a physician and  poet who first  studied  law  at  Edinburgh  and  Paris graduating with an  M.A. from Edinburgh in  1671. He turned  his  attention  to  medicine,  and commenced  to  practise  in  Edinburgh,  around  1681. He was appointed professor of  physic  at  Leyden, in 1692,  resigning  his  chair.  On returning  to  Edinburgh,  however, around 1693, he was  suspected  of  being  at heart  an  atheist,  chiefly  on  account  of  his  mockery  of  the puritanical  strictness  of  the Presbyterian  church. He was the reputed  author  of  two  satirical  works,  'The  Assembly,  or Scotch  Reformation  :  a  Comedy,'  1692,  and  Habel,  a  Satirical  Poem,'  1692. He  wrote  also  a  number  of  Latin verses.  He  was  one  of  the  most celebrated  physicians  of  his  time.

Early life 
Pitcairne was born in Edinburgh, Scotland. After obtaining some classical education at the school of Dalkeith, Pitcairne entered Edinburgh University in 1668, and took his degree of MA in 1671. Having been sent to France for the benefit of his health, he was induced at Paris to begin the study of medicine, and after courses at Edinburgh and Paris he obtained in 1680 the degree of MD at Reims University.

Private practice and academic appointment 
He began practice at Edinburgh, and was appointed one of three professors of medicine at the Royal College of Physicians of Edinburgh in 1685.  In a short time he acquired so great a reputation that in 1692 he was appointed to the Chair of the Practice of Medicine at the University of Leiden. Among his pupils were Richard Mead and George Cheyne and both of them attributed much of their skill to what they had learned from Pitcairne. During Pitcairne's time in Leiden, he is also thought to have taught the great Dutch physician and "father of physiology" Herman Boerhaave.

In 1693 Pitcairne returned to Scotland to marry a daughter of Sir Archibald Stevenson, an eminent physician in Edinburgh. The family objected to her going abroad, so he did not return to Leiden, but settled once more in Edinburgh. He rose to be the first physician in Scotland, and was frequently called into consultation both in England and the Netherlands.

Anatomical studies 

Soon after his return to Edinburgh, Pitcairne made an offer to the town council that would see him and some of his colleagues treat paupers for free at the hospital of Paul's Work at the foot of Calton Hill. In return, he requested that he could dissect the bodies of those that died at the hospital and went unclaimed by their relatives, and who had to be buried at the town's expense. While some of Edinburgh's surgeons strongly opposed the arrangement, the town council eventually accepted Pitcairne's offer, which provided an early boost to the teaching of medicine at the University of Edinburgh.

Pitcairne's medical opinions are chiefly contained in a volume of Dissertationes medicae which he published in 1701 (2nd ed. 1713). Pitcairne was close friends with mathematician David Gregory, with whom he wrote mathematical papers, which in turn informed his hypothesis that Newtonian physics more accurately described bodily functions than the balance of humours. The Dissertationes build on this idea and discuss the circulation of the blood in the smaller vessels, the difference in the quantity of the blood contained in the lungs of animals in the womb and of the same animals after birth, the motions by which food becomes fit to supply the blood, the cure of fevers by evacuating medicines, the effects of acids and alkalis in medicine, and the question as to inventors in medicine (he supported the claim that William Harvey had discovered the circulation of the blood, rather than Hippocrates). His championing of this new 'iatromechanical' theory of physiology played a large part in his professorial appointments in Edinburgh and Leiden. He corresponded occasionally with Isaac Newton himself and visited him on his journey to Leiden in 1692.

Writings 
Pitcairne was a good classical scholar, and wrote Latin verses, occasionally with something more than mere imitative cleverness and skill. He was the joint author of a comedy, The Assembly, or Scotch Reformation, originally entitled The Phanaticks (1691), and of a satirical poem Babel, containing witty sketches of prominent Presbyterian divines of the time, whom, as a loudly avowed Jacobite, he strongly disliked.

Beliefs and private life 
He was prone to irreverent and ribald jests, and thus gained the reputation of being an unbeliever and an atheist, though he was a professed deist. The stories about his over-indulgence in drink are probably exaggerated. He was repeatedly involved in violent quarrels with his medical brethren and others, and once or twice got into scrapes with the government on account of his indiscreet political utterances.

Among his friends, however, he was evidently well liked, and he is known to have acted with great kindness and generosity to deserving men who needed his help. Thomas Ruddiman, the Scottish scholar, for example, was rescued from a life of obscurity by his encouragement and assistance. Mead, too, appears never to have forgotten what he owed to his old teacher at Leiden.

When a son of Pitcairne's participated in the Jacobite rising of 1715 and was subsequently condemned to death, he was saved by the earnest interposition of Mead with Sir Robert Walpole. He pleaded, very artfully, that if Walpole's health had been bettered by Mead's skill, or if members of the royal family were preserved by his care, it was owing to the instruction he had received from Dr Pitcairne.

Death and legacy 

Pitcairne died in Edinburgh on 20 October 1713, aged 60. He had been a great collector of books, and his library, which is said to have been of considerable value, was, through the influence of Ruddiman, sold to Peter the Great of Russia.

He is buried in Greyfriars Kirkyard with his wife Elizabeth Stevenson (d.1734) and his daughters. The grave lies in the southern section known as the Covenanters Prison and can be viewed by special arrangement or on an organised tour.

A second (more public) faux grave exists in the northmost section of the graveyard, erected by Dr Andrew Duncan.

References

Sources

Further reading

External links

1652 births
1713 deaths
17th-century Scottish medical doctors
18th-century Scottish medical doctors
Medical doctors from Edinburgh
Alumni of the University of Edinburgh
University of Paris alumni
Scottish scholars and academics
Academic staff of Leiden University
Scottish anatomists
Scottish medical historians
Scottish dramatists and playwrights
Burials at Greyfriars Kirkyard
17th-century Scottish historians
18th-century Scottish historians
Reims University (1548–1793) alumni